Strathcona Township is a geographic township comprising a portion of the municipality of Temagami in Northeastern Ontario, Canada. It is used for geographic purposes, such as land surveying and natural resource explorations. A portion of the northeast arm of Lake Temagami lies at its northwestern corner. Neighbouring geographic townships include Strathy Township, Chambers Township, Briggs Township, Riddle Township and Cassels Township.

Notes

References